Romulus Daniel Miclea (born 5 April 1980 in Târgu Mureș) is a Romanian football player who plays as a right winger for ASA Târgu Mureș.

External links
 
 

1980 births
Living people
Association football midfielders
Sportspeople from Târgu Mureș
Romanian footballers
CSM Reșița players
FC U Craiova 1948 players
FC Politehnica Iași (1945) players
CS Gaz Metan Mediaș players